Niels Clemmensen   (1900–1950) was a Danish pianist and composer, brother of Carl Henrik Clemmensen.

Notable works 
Fra Kap til Kronborg (1930)
Den er fin med kompasset (1930)
Tjin-Tjin-Juanita (1930)
Union Jack (1931)
Paustians ur (1932)
Katinka, Katinka (1936)
Søren Bramfris lærkesang (1940)
De tre skolekammerater (1944).
14 mand og Hera
Rimonde
To hvide liljer og en knækket søjle
Med Kronborg om Styrbord igen

References
This article was initially translated from the Danish Wikipedia.

Male composers
Danish pianists
1900 births
1950 deaths
20th-century pianists
20th-century Danish composers
Male pianists
20th-century Danish male musicians